Janusz Majewski may refer to:

 Janusz Majewski (director) (born 1931), Polish film director
 Janusz Majewski (fencer) (born 1940), Polish Olympic fencer